Black walnut may refer to:

Trees 
Family Juglandaceae, genus Juglans sect. Rhysocaryon:
 Juglans nigra, the eastern black walnut, a species of flowering tree native to eastern North America.
 Juglans californica, California black walnut or Southern California black walnut.
 Juglans hindsii, the Northern California walnut or Hinds' black walnut.
 Juglans major, Arizona black walnut.
 Juglans microcarpa, Texas black walnut or little black walnut.
 Juglans venezuelensis, a species of black walnut endemic to Venezuela.
Other:
 Endiandra globosa, an unrelated species of Australian rainforest tree from the family Lauraceae.
 Endiandra palmerstonii, another species of Australian rainforest tree from the family Lauraceae.

Places 
Black Walnut, Missouri, a community in the United States
Black Walnut (Clover, Virginia), a historic house in Virginia